Adaklı District is a district of Bingöl Province in Turkey. The town of Adaklı is the seat and the district had a population of 8,243 in 2021.

The district was established in 1987.

Composition 
Beside the town of Adaklı, the district encompasses thirty-three villages and ninety-one hamlets.

 Akbinek
 Aktaş
 Altınevler
 Aysaklı
 Ayvadüzü
 Bağlarpınarı
 Boyalı
 Cevizli
 Çamlıca
 Çatma
 Çevreli
 Doğankaya
 Doluçay
 Dolutekne
 Elmaağaç
 Elmadüzü
 Erbaşlar
 Erler
 Gökçeli
 Hasbağlar
 Kabaçalı
 Kamışgölü
 Karaçubuk
 Kaynakdüzü
 Kırkpınar
 Kozlu
 Maltepe
 Mercan
 Sarıdibek
 Sevkar
 Sütlüce
 Topağaçlar
 Yeldeğirmeni

References 

Districts of Bingöl Province